Drumcullen GAA is a Gaelic Athletic Association club located in the townland of Drumcullen, County Offaly, Ireland. The club is almost exclusively concerned with the game of hurling.

Honours
 Offaly Senior Hurling Championship (17): 1908, 1918, 1919, 1924, 1925, 1927, 1928, 1929, 1933, 1941, 1950, 1951, 1952, 1954, 1957, 1958, 1960
 Offaly Intermediate Hurling Championship (1): 2010
 Offaly Junior A Hurling Championship (6) 1915, 1932, 1943, 1972, 1974, 2005

Notable players
 Pat Fleury
 Conor Gath
 Paddy Molloy

References

External links
 Drumcullen GAA on GAA Info website

Gaelic games clubs in County Offaly
Hurling clubs in County Offaly